The South African Railways Class D 2-6-4T of 1898 was a steam locomotive from the pre-Union era in Transvaal.

Between 1898 and 1900, the Pretoria-Pietersburg Railway placed six   "Adriatic" type tank steam locomotives in service. During the Second Boer War, the Transvaal government took possession of the railway and it was operated as part of the Netherlands-South African Railway Company, until the Imperial Military Railways took over all railway operations in the Zuid-Afrikaansche Republiek.

At the end of the war, these locomotives were taken onto the roster of the Central South African Railways, renumbered and designated Class D. In 1912, when these engines were assimilated into the South African Railways, they were renumbered once again, but retained their Class D classification.

The Pretoria-Pietersburg Railway

The Pretoria-Pietersburg Railway (PPR) was a private railway which operated between Pretoria West via Warmbad and Nylstroom to Pietersburg. It was constructed under a concession granted by the government of the South African Republic (ZAR) to Hendrik Jacobus Schoeman on 30 October 1895. Construction commenced in 1897 and the railway was opened to traffic as far as Nylstroom by 1 July 1898. Potgietersrus was reached on 1 October 1898 and Pietersburg on 1 May 1899.

Manufacturer
In 1897, the PPR ordered six  locomotives from Beyer, Peacock & Company. At the time, these locomotives were amongst the most advanced designs yet to be seen in South Africa.

Characteristics
The locomotives were the first in South Africa to be equipped with Belpaire fireboxes. The cylinders were arranged outside the plate frames, while the valves were arranged above the cylinders and actuated by Walschaerts valve gear.

Service

Pretoria-Pietersburg Railway
Five of the six locomotives were delivered to the PPR in 1898. They were to be numbered in the range from 1 to 6, but no. 5 was lost at sea. No. 6 was therefore renumbered to no. 5 to rectify the gap in the numbering sequence and a replacement for the lost locomotive was ordered from Beyer, Peacock & Company.

Of these locomotives, no. 1 was the only one to be named. It bore the name President Kruger in cast brass plates on the tank sides.

NZASM
As a result of the outbreak of the Second Boer War in 1899, the ZAR government took possession of the PPR and its rolling stock in October 1899, just five months after completion of the railway. The line was then briefly worked by the Nederlandsche-Zuid-Afrikaansche Spoorweg-Maatschappij (NZASM), until that railway was itself seized by the Imperial Military Railways (IMR) by the end of the same year.

With these locomotives being the only mainline engines to actually see service on the PPR, and with the railway only being in existence for five months before it was taken possession of by the NZASM, it was not officially classified.

Imperial Military Railways
At the outbreak of the war, control of all railways in the Cape of Good Hope and Colony of Natal was taken over by the invading British military. It was operated by the IMR, which was established on 7 October 1899 upon the appointment of Lieutenant Colonel E.P.C. Girouard KCMG DSO RE as Director of Railways for the South African Field Forces. While Girouard largely left control of the Cape Government Railways (CGR) and the Natal Government Railways (NGR) in the hands of the civilian staff, the railway lines of the Oranje-Vrijstaat Gouwerment-Spoorwegen (OVGS) in the Orange Free State and of the NZASM and its recently seized PPR in the ZAR came under the IMR's control as possession was obtained of their lines.

The replacement sixth locomotive was delivered to the IMR in 1900 and became the new no. 6.

Central South African Railways
Hostilities ceased on 1 June 1902. On 1 July 1902, the IMR was transferred to civilian control and became the Central South African Railways (CSAR). These six locomotives were taken onto its roster, designated the CSAR's Class D and renumbered in the range from 209 to 214.

This resulted in the engines being able to haul the same load as a 7th Class locomotive.

South African Railways
When the Union of South Africa was established on 31 May 1910, the three Colonial government railways (CGR, NGR and CSAR) were united under a single administration to control and administer the railways, ports and harbours of the Union. Although the South African Railways and Harbours came into existence in 1910, the actual classification and renumbering of all the rolling stock of the three constituent railways were only implemented with effect from 1 January 1912.

In 1912, these six locomotives retained their Class D designation on the South African Railways (SAR), but they were renumbered once again, in the range from 56 to 61. In SAR service, the Class D was used on suburban traffic on the Witwatersrand and in the Western Cape. They gave good service until they were withdrawn from service and scrapped in 1930.

Works numbers
The Class D works numbers and renumbering are listed in the table.

References

External links

Beyer, Peacock locomotives
Cape gauge railway locomotives
Railway locomotives introduced in 1898
Steam locomotives of South Africa
2-6-4T locomotives